The Supa Ngwao Museum is located in the Francistown city in Botswana. It is the Regional Museum for Francistown and the North East Region (the North East District and adjacent areas of the
Central District). It is a public institution dedicated to human history, culture, tradition and crafts from north east Botswana. The museum was established in the year 1986, largely to preserve the historical information about the Francistown city and other places around it in the northern region. Supa Ngwao museum is responsible for showcasing the history and culture of Kalanga people. There are three sections at the Supa museum including the museum, information center and the craft shop.

History
Supa Ngwao museum was first established as a mobile museum with the main aim of preserving, teaching about the human history's, arts and culture of the Kalanga people and people living in northern Botswana.

Gallery of Supa Ngwao Museum

References

External links
Official site

Museums established in 1986
1986 establishments in Botswana
Museums in Botswana